{{DISPLAYTITLE:C22H27NO}}
The molecular formula C22H27NO (molar mass: 321.45 g/mol, exact mass: 321.2093 u) may refer to:

 Etybenzatropine, also known as ethybenztropine and tropethydrylin
 Phenazocine

Molecular formulas